Sidney Barnard (born 10 July 1914) was an English professional footballer who played as an inside right. He made appearances in the English Football League for Wrexham.

References

1914 births
Date of death unknown
English footballers
Association football forwards
English Football League players
Blackburn Rovers F.C. players
Stockport County F.C. players
Bangor City F.C. players
Wrexham A.F.C. players